The 1977 Coupe de France Final was a football match held at Parc des Princes, Paris on June 18, 1977, that saw AS Saint-Étienne defeat Stade de Reims 2–1 thanks to goals by Dominique Bathenay and Alain Merchadier.

Match details

See also
Coupe de France 1976-77

External links
Coupe de France results at Rec.Sport.Soccer Statistics Foundation
Report on French federation site

Coupe
1977
Coupe De France Final 1977
Coupe De France Final 1977
Coupe de France Final
Coupe de France Final